The 1877 New South Wales colonial election was held between 24 October and 12 November 1877. This election was for all of the 73 seats in the New South Wales Legislative Assembly and it was conducted in 53 single-member constituencies, six 2-member constituencies and two 4-member constituencies, all with a first past the post system. Suffrage was limited to adult male British subjects, resident in New South Wales. The previous parliament of New South Wales was dissolved on 12 October 1877 by the Governor, Sir Hercules Robinson, on the advice of the Premier, Sir John Robertson.

There was no recognisable party structure at this election; instead the government was determined by a loose, shifting factional system. Although the leaders of the main groupings at this election were Robertson and Sir Henry Parkes, the subsequent government was formed by James Farnell as a compromise Premier. Farnell's government lasted a year and two days.

Key dates

Results
{{Australian elections/Title row
| table style = float:right;clear:right;margin-left:1em;
| title        = New South Wales colonial election, 24 October – 12 November 1877
| house        = Legislative Assembly
| series       = New South Wales colonial election
| back         = 1874–75
| forward      = 1880
| enrolled     = 
| total_votes  = 98,503
| turnout %    = 48.31
| turnout chg  = +1.10
| informal     = 680
| informal %   = 1.01
| informal chg = −0.19
}}

|}

References

See also
 Members of the New South Wales Legislative Assembly, 1877–1880
 Candidates of the 1877 New South Wales colonial election

1877
1877 elections in Australia
1870s in New South Wales
October 1877 events
November 1877 events